Chak No.16/1-L, Rangron Wala is a village situated some 5 kilometres left from Renala Khurd in Okara District, Punjab, Pakistan.
A road passes nearby the village and links it to Depalpur, Pakpattan and Renala Khurd.
The [1] was established after the construction of Lower Bari Doab Canal.
According to Politics, Rao Zaigham Mujhtaba is a well known politician of Renala Khurd from 16-1/L.

Religion
Islam is religions of the inhabitants of the village.

Languages
Haryanavi, Punjabi, Ranghari and Urdu are basic languages of the people. Now, new generation is also well conversant with English.

Crops
The land is very fertile and rich in production of various crops such as wheat, sugarcane, cotton, and vegetables, but unfortunately the underground water is heavy which is not useful for cultivation. People often keep buffaloes, cows, sheep, goats, hens, and ducks for milk, meat and eggs.

Villages in Okara District